Evolutionarily Distinct and Globally Endangered (EDGE) species are animal species which have a high 'EDGE score', a metric combining endangered conservation status with the genetic distinctiveness of the particular taxon. Distinctive species have few closely related species, and EDGE species are often the only surviving member of their genus or even higher taxonomic rank. The extinction of such species would therefore represent a disproportionate loss of unique evolutionary history and  biodiversity.

Some EDGE species, such as elephants and pandas, are well-known and already receive considerable conservation attention, but many others, such as the vaquita (the world's rarest cetacean) the bumblebee bat (arguably the world's smallest mammal) and the egg-laying long-beaked echidnas, are highly threatened yet remain poorly understood, and are frequently overlooked by existing conservation frameworks.

The Zoological Society of London launched the EDGE of Existence Programme in 2007 to raise awareness and funds for the conservation of these species. As of 2019, the programme has awarded 97 fellows funds to help conserve 87 different species in over 40 countries.

Calculating EDGE Scores

ED

Some species are more distinct than others because they represent a larger amount of unique evolution. Species like the aardvark have few close relatives and have been evolving independently for many millions of years. Others like the domestic dog originated only recently and have many close relatives. Species uniqueness can be measured as an 'Evolutionary Distinctiveness' (ED) score, using a phylogeny, or evolutionary tree. ED scores are calculated relative to a clade of species descended from a common ancestor. The three clades for which the EDGE of Existence Programme has calculated scores are all classes, namely mammals, amphibians, and corals. 

The phylogenetic tree has the most recent common ancestor at the root, all the current species as the leaves, and intermediate nodes at each point of branching divergence. The branches are divided into segments (between one node and another node, a leaf, or the root). Each segment is assigned an ED score defined as the timespan it covers (in millions of years) divided by the number of species at the end of the subtree it forms. The ED of a species is the sum of the ED of the segments connecting it to the root. Thus, a long branch which produces few species will have a high ED, as the corresponding species are relatively distinctive, with few close relatives. ED metrics are not exact, because of uncertainties in both the ordering of nodes and the length of segments.

GE
GE is a number corresponding to a species' conservation status according to the International Union for Conservation of Nature with more endangered species having a higher GE:

EDGE
The EDGE score of a species is derived from its scores for Evolutionary Distinctness (ED) and for Globally Endangered status (GE) as follows:

This means that a doubling in ED affects the EDGE score almost as much as increasing the threat level by one (e.g. from 'vulnerable' to 'endangered'). EDGE scores are an estimate of the expected loss of evolutionary history per unit time.

EDGE species are species which have an above average ED score and are threatened with extinction (critically endangered, endangered or vulnerable). There are currently 564 EDGE mammal species (≈12% of the total). Potential EDGE species are those with high ED scores but whose conservation status is unclear (data deficient or not evaluated).

Focal species 
Focal species are typically selected from the priority EDGE species —the top 100 amphibians, birds, mammals and reptiles, top 50 sharks and rays, and top 25 corals— however, they also prioritise species outside these rankings. Such species can also have a very high ED but fall outside the top 100 EDGE rankings. These species are conserved by 'EDGE Fellows', who collect data on these species and develop conservation action plans.

Top 20 2019/20 focal species

Numbers refer to EDGE rank

1. Largetooth sawfish (Pristis pristis)
2. Attenborough’s long-beaked echidna (Zaglossus attenboroughi)
3. Chinese giant salamander (Andrias davidianus)
4. Green sawfish (Pristis zijsron)
5. Purple frog (Nasikabatrachus sahyadrensis)
6. Seychelles palm frog (Sooglossus pipilodryas)
7. Thomasset's Seychelles frogs (Sooglossus thomasseti)
8. Hispaniolan solenodon (Solenodon paradoxus)
9. Chinese crocodile lizard (Shinisaurus crocodilurus)
10. Bengal florican (Houbaropsis bengalensis)
11. Black rhinoceros (Diceros bicornis)
12. Mountainous star coral (Orbicella faveolata)
13. Ganges river dolphin (Platanista gangetica)
14. Bactrian camel (Camelus ferus)
15. Philippine eagle (Pithecophaga jefferyi)
16. Northern Darwin’s frog (Rhinoderma rufum)
17. Hawksbill turtle (Eretmochelys imbricata)
18. Gharial (Gavialis gangeticus)
19. Chinese pangolin (Manis pentadactyla)
20. Togo slippery frog (Conraua derooi)

References

External links 
EDGE of Existence website
ZSL−Zoological Society of London website

 
Animals by conservation status
Endangered animals
Species by conservation status
Zoological Society of London